The 1984 Masters Tournament was the 48th Masters Tournament, held April 12–15 at Augusta National Golf Club in Augusta, Georgia. Ben Crenshaw won the first of his two major titles, both Masters, two strokes ahead of runner-up Tom Watson, the winner in 1977 and 1981.

The leader after 36 holes was Masters rookie Mark Lye at 135 (−9), three strokes ahead of Tom Kite. Play was halted near the end of the third round due to thunderstorms and the final groups completed it on Sunday morning. After 54 holes, Kite led at 207 (−9) and Lye was a stroke back. Crenshaw was two strokes back at 209 and shot a final round 68 (−4) to slip on his first green jacket. He won again eleven years later in 1995.

Defending champion Seve Ballesteros was assessed a two-stroke penalty in the second round for grounding his club within the confines of a water hazard at the 13th hole and missed the cut by a stroke. He also missed the cut as defending champion in 1981.

Normally scheduled to conclude on the second Sunday of April, this Masters was held a week later, as was 1979.

Course

Field
1. Masters champions
Tommy Aaron, George Archer (8), Seve Ballesteros (3,8,9,11,12), Gay Brewer, Billy Casper, Charles Coody, Raymond Floyd (4,8,9,12,13), Doug Ford, Bob Goalby, Jack Nicklaus (2,4,10,12), Arnold Palmer, Gary Player, Craig Stadler (8,9,12,13), Art Wall Jr., Tom Watson (2,3,8,9,11,12,13), Fuzzy Zoeller (8,10,11,12,13)

Jack Burke Jr., Ralph Guldahl, Claude Harmon, Ben Hogan, Herman Keiser, Cary Middlecoff, Byron Nelson, Henry Picard, Gene Sarazen, and Sam Snead did not play.

The following categories only apply to Americans

2. U.S. Open champions (last five years)
Hale Irwin (8,11,12), Larry Nelson (4,9)

3. The Open champions (last five years)
Bill Rogers

4. PGA champions (last five years)
Hal Sutton (9,10,12)

5. 1983 U.S. Amateur semi-finalists
Clark Burroughs (a), Chris Perry (a), Clifton Pierce (a), Jay Sigel (6,7,a)

6. Previous two U.S. Amateur and Amateur champions

7. Members of the 1983 U.S. Walker Cup team
Nathaniel Crosby (a), Rick Fehr (a), William Hoffer (a), Jim Holtgrieve (a), Bob Lewis (a), David Tentis (a), Billy Tuten (a)

Brad Faxon and Willie Wood forfeited their exemptions by turning professional.

8. Top 24 players and ties from the 1983 Masters Tournament
Ben Crenshaw (11,12,13), Keith Fergus, Mark Hayes, Peter Jacobsen (10,12), Tom Kite (11,12,13), Wayne Levi (11,12), Johnny Miller (12), Gil Morgan (9,12,13), Dan Pohl (10), Jack Renner (11), Scott Simpson (9), J. C. Snead, Lee Trevino, Lanny Wadkins (9,11,12,13), Tom Weiskopf

9. Top 16 players and ties from the 1983 U.S. Open
Chip Beck, Lennie Clements, Ralph Landrum, Pat McGowan (10), Mike Nicolette, Andy North, David Ogrin, Calvin Peete (11,12,13), Jim Thorpe

10. Top eight players and ties from 1983 PGA Championship
John Fought, Bruce Lietzke (11)

11. Winners of PGA Tour events since the previous Masters
Andy Bean (12), Ronnie Black, Rex Caldwell (12), Jim Colbert (12), John Cook (12), Fred Couples (12), Bob Eastwood (12), Danny Edwards, David Edwards, Morris Hatalsky, Gary Koch (12), Pat Lindsey, Mark Lye (12), John Mahaffey, Mark McCumber (12), Larry Mize, Tom Purtzer, Payne Stewart (12), Curtis Strange (12,13)

12. Top 30 players from the 1983 PGA Tour money list
Ed Fiori, Jay Haas (13)

13. Members of the U.S. 1983 Ryder Cup team
Bob Gilder

14. Foreign invitations
Isao Aoki (8), Nick Faldo (8), David Graham (2,4,9,11,12), Bernhard Langer, Tsuneyuki Nakajima (8), Greg Norman, Peter Oosterhuis (8), Philip Parkin (6,a), Nick Price (11)

Numbers in brackets indicate categories that the player would have qualified under had they been American.

Round summaries

First round
Thursday, April 12, 1984

Source:

Second round
Friday, April 13, 1984

Source:

Third round
Saturday, April 14, 1984
Sunday, April 15, 1984

The third round had an hour-long weather delay and another thunderstorm hit shortly after 6 pm EST, which halted play for the day. Nineteen players did not complete the round on Saturday; the final pairing of Mark Lye and Tom Kite had just hit their tee shots at the par-3 12th hole. Play was resumed at 8 am on Sunday morning.

Source:

Final round
Sunday, April 15, 1984

Final leaderboard

Sources:

Scorecard

Cumulative tournament scores, relative to par

References

External links 
 Masters.com – Past winners
 Augusta.com – 1984 Masters leaderboard and scorecards

1984
1984 in golf
1984 in American sports
1984 in sports in Georgia (U.S. state)
April 1984 sports events in the United States